Stephen Williams was an African American man, lynched in Upper Marlboro, Maryland on October 20, 1894.

Williams had confessed to assaulting Mrs. Katie Hardesty, an offense described as "one of the most brutal in the criminal annals of Prince George's County" and was locked up in the Jail in Upper Marlboro.  A group of masked men broke into the jail and pulled Williams from under his mattress, put a rope around his neck and dragged him from the jail.  Williams was dragged to the "iron bridge just between the town and the railroad depot."  The rope was thrown over the top beams of the bridge and Williams was "hauled up."   A round of gunfire was unleashed into Williams' hanging body and the corpse was left dangling on the bridge.

This was the same bridge that Joe Vermillion was lynched on in 1889.

References

1894 deaths
1894 in Maryland
1894 murders in the United States
African-American history of Prince George's County, Maryland
Williams, Stephen
Racially motivated violence against African Americans
Prince George's County, Maryland
October 1894 events